Dieudonné Kwizera (born 6 August 1967) is a retired Burundian middle distance runner who specialized in the 800 metres.

In 1987 he won a bronze medal at the All-Africa Games in Nairobi, and the next year he finished third at the IAAF Grand Prix Final behind Tom McKean and Sebastian Coe, both of Great Britain.

International competitions

External links

1967 births
Living people
Burundian male middle-distance runners
Olympic male middle-distance runners
Olympic athletes of Burundi
Athletes (track and field) at the 1996 Summer Olympics
African Games bronze medalists for Burundi
African Games medalists in athletics (track and field)
Athletes (track and field) at the 1987 All-Africa Games
World Athletics Championships athletes for Burundi
Japan Championships in Athletics winners
20th-century Burundian people
21st-century Burundian people